Kombatan is a Filipino martial arts system. The founder of the system was GGM Ernesto Amador Presas (10th DAN). The current head of the system is Ernesto Presas Jr. The style is known for its double stick techniques, but it features other stick and blade techniques, as well as empty-hand methods.

Ernesto A. Presas Sr. was born in the coastal town of Hinigaran, Negros Occidental on May 20, 1945. At age 8 he began his martial arts training under his father, Jose Presas, a well known escrima practitioner at that time. He went on to be an athlete in his college years, participating in various sports. His training in the martial arts is eclectic, having studied judo, jujutsu, karate, and various forms of Filipino and Japanese weaponry. He was Lakan Sampu (10th Dan) in arnis and Mano Mano (hand-to-hand combat) and Lakan Walo (8th Dan) in Philippine Weaponry.

Remy Presas recognized that the classical arts of their country were losing their appeal and therefore slowly dying. He  modernized the native arts into an effective fighting system that would be appealing to martial arts students living in modern Filipino society and called it Modern Arnis. His dream to re-introduce the native arts led to the development of Modern Arnis.  Ernesto Presas continued the work after his brother emigrated to the US in 1975. He changed his version of the art a lot in the nineties and then he re-christen his version of the art to the name of Kombatan.

In 1970 he began to teach the Filipino martial arts in the University of the Philippines and Lyceum of the Philippines. Later other classes expanded to the University of Santo Tomas, Central Colleges of the Philippines, the Far Eastern Military Academy, Philippine National Police Academy, and the Philippines Air Force Officer's School. Also in 1970 he was invited to Japan at Expo '70''' to demonstrate Arnis.  He quickly earned the respect of many of the Japanese masters who called his Art Filipino Kendo.  After returning home, with the help of his friend Frederico Lazo, he opened his first club.  Later he formed the Modern Arnis Association of the Philippines International and the ARJUKEN (which stands for Arnis, Jujutsu, Kendo) Karate Association to formally spread the art within the Philippines. In 1975 he founded the International Philippine Martial Arts Federation (IPMAF) and began to spread the Filipino art to the outside world. In time his Arnis Presas Style and techniques became widely accepted and adopted by countries in Europe, the United States, Canada, Mexico, Australia, New Zealand, South Africa, Saudi Arabia and Puerto Rico. He has also published numerous books and videos and has been featured on the cover of Inside Kung Fu magazine with the title "Ernesto Presas: The Father of Mano-Mano" (which art he created).

Ernesto Presas traveled the world teaching seminars to spread his art. Many visited the Philippines to take lessons from him in Manila.

Major practitioners include: Ernesto Amador Presas (deceased), Fred Lazo (deceased), Ernesto Presas Jr., Pepe Yap, Mike Bowers, Alex France, Lito Concepcion, Tim Hartman, Juerg Ziegler (deceased), Dr. Carlos Deleon, John R. Malmo, Librando Castillo, Jon Rudy, Jeff Traish, Chris Traish, Andy Elliott, Richard Marlin, Shelley Millspaugh, Vincent Pernice, Wolfgang Schnur,  Walter Hubmann, Edwin Lao,  Thorbjørn “Toby” Hartelius, Johan Skålberg, Alex Ercia, Audy Ercia, Tomi Harell, Jose G. Paman, Randy Remolin, Jess Pablo (deceased), Matt Nocerino, Carlos Pulanco, Andreas Boruta, Giovanni Zagari, Patrick Paulo, Marina Regnér, and Uno Feldthusen.

 Current Chief Instructors 
Grandmaster Ernesto Presas Jr. (10th Dan) - Manila, Philippines
Grandmaster Wolfgang Schnur (10th Dan) - Germany
Grandmaster Carlos Deleon (10th Dan) - California, USA, Guatemala, Argentina, Brazil.
Grandmaster Mike Bowers (10th Dan)- Portland, USA
Grandmaster Warlito Concepcion (9th Dan) - Cebu, Philippines
Grandmaster Tim Hartman (9th Dan) - New York, USA
Grandmaster Pepe Yap (9th Dan) - Laguna, Philippines
Grandmaster Alex France (9th Dan) - California, USA
Grandmaster Rick Manglinong (9th Dan)- California, USA
Grandmaster Shelley Millspaugh (9th Dan)- Colorado, USA
Grandmaster Matt Nocerino (8th Dan) - California, USA
Grandmaster Bernard Lapointe (8th Dan) - California, USA
Grandmaster Alex Ercia (8th Dan) - California, USA
Grandmaster John R. Malmo (8th Dan)- Midwest, USA
Grandmaster Toby Hartelius (8th Dan) - Denmark
Grandmaster Andy Elliot (8th Dan) - Australia & New Zealand
Grandmaster Walter Hubmann (8th Dan) - Austria
Grandmaster Roland Herlt (8th Dan) - Germany
Senior Master Chris Delgado (7th Dan) - California, USA
Senior Master Mark Cox (7th Dan) - California, USA
Senior Master Kurt Graham (7th Dan) - New Zealand
Senior Master Vincent Pernice (7th Dan) - Kansas, USA
Senior Master Tomi Harrell (7th Dan) - Finland
Senior Master Randy Remolin (7th Dan) - Italy
Master Daniel Tiliano (6th Dan) - Oregon, USA
Master Maic Andreé (6th Dan) - Germany
Master Ask Agger (6th Dan) - Denmark
Master Pablo Gobbi (5th Dan) - Argentina
Master Edwin Mejia (5th Dan) - Guatemala
Master Richard Bigham (5th Dan) - USA
Master Librando Castillo (5th Dan) - California, USA
Master Fidel Bonifacio (5th Dan) - Edmonton, Alberta, Canada
Master Marina Regner (5th Dan) - Sweden
Master Giovanni Zagari (5th Dan) - Singapore
Master Scott Taylor (5th Dan)- Nebraska, USA
Master Ralf Notter (5th Dan) - Germany
Guro Damian Rosatti (4th Dan) - Argentina
Guro Gustavo Garcia Leon (4th Dan) - Argentina
Guro Federico Dinatale (4th Dan) - Brazil
Guro Ted Villanueva (4th Dan) - Oregon, USA
Master Vernon Taylor (4th Dan)- Nebraska                                          
Guro Salavador Caballero (3rd Dan) - Spain
Guro Damon Abraham (3rd Dan) - Colorado, USA
Guro Rainer Benjatschek (2nd Dan) - Germany
Guro Kalli Schlauch (2nd Dan) - Ireland
Guro Cian White (2nd Dan) - Ireland 
Guro Daniel Kroupa (4nd Dan) - Czech Republic
Guro Jhun Occidental (2nd Dan) - Virginia, USA
Guro Paulo Vilaça (3rd Dan) - Portugal

 Styles 
Kombatan combines several traditional Filipino styles that have been blended into a single art:
Palis
Hirada Batangueno - Pinayong. Commonly referred to as hirada bantagueña, after the Batangas province from which it originated, pinayong is Kombatan's "umbrella" block-and-counter pattern.  It consists of an umbrella-like covering block/counter followed with any number of strikes; often an upward strike that can impact areas such as the groin, chin, or forearm. 
Sungkiti Tutsada - Sungkiti also called tutsada, tuslok, or salag tusok represents the deadly thrusting techniques that can devastate an opponent.  It is especially effective for combat in places where lateral movement is restricted.  Sungkiti aims to attack vulnerable areas like the eyes, throat, solar plexus, underarms, and groin.
Abaniko Largo / Corto
Doblada / Doblete
Banda y Banda
Ocho Ocho - Ocho ocho means "figure eight," and this pattern of movement follows the path of the infinity symbol.  Ocho ocho may be delivered in a wide or tight manner, depending on the situation.
Sinawali
Espada Y Daga - sword and dagger, or stick and dagger methods
Daga sa Daga
Dulo Dulo - The dulo dulo is a specialty weapon of Kombatan.  It is simply a short stick, or horn, of about six inches with points at both ends.  It is used in close quarters to attack sensitive areas of the body.  It can be utilized to strike; to force your opponent to release you from a grabbing attack; or to magnify the effect of a joint lock by attacking the sensitive points you are controlling.
Dos Puntas
Tres Puntas
Bangkaw - The bangkaw is a staff, usually around six-feet in length, used to attack and defend.  Kombatan features techniques for its use against another staff, as well as other weapons.  Its primary advantage is its long reach.  With it, one can counter an attack from an opponent armed with a bolo or knife without coming into close proximity.  The bangkaw is a martial adaptation of the long stick that is used in rural areas of the Philippines to carry two large buckets of water on ones shoulder.
Sibat
Mano-Mano
Sipaan
Dumog

 See also 
 Modern Arnis
 Arnis
 Balintawak Eskrima
 Doce Pares
 Filipino Martial Arts

 References 

Action Pursuit Group Media. (1983). Arnis. Masters and Styles, (3).
Action Pursuit Group Media. (1991). Father of Modern Mano Mano teaching art to the world. Inside Kung-Fu, 18(6).
Bayot France, A. B. (2011). Great Grandmaster Ernesto Presas Kombatan. FMA Informative (1).
CFW Enterprises. (1998). The Presas family: founders of Modern Arnis. Filipino Martial Arts Magazine, 1(1).
CFW Enterprises. (2000). An interview with Grandmaster Ernesto A. Presas. Filipino Martial Arts Magazine, 2(4).
CFW Enterprises. (2000). Ernesto Presas Filipino Kombatan. Martial Arts Combat & Sports, 21(5).
CFW Enterprises. (2001, January). Master Ernesto Presas - Kombatan empty-hands. Filipino Martial Arts Magazine.CFW Enterprises. (2001, August). Learn Kombatan's 12-strikes method. Filipino Martial Arts Magazine.Dowd, S. (1999). Great Grandmaster Ernesto A. Presas. FMA Digest.
Hockheim, H. W. (2002, December). Ernesto Presas jungle fighter. Close Quarter Combat(15).
Pacific Rim Publishing. (1999). Training in the Philippines. World of Martial Arts.
Paman, J. (1982). "Arjuken Martial Arts Club Basic Training Manual", Philippines.
Paman, J. (2006). The Art of the Flow, Inside Kung-Fu Magazine
Paman, J. (2007). "Arnis Self-Defense: Stick, Blade, and Empty-Hand Combat Techniques of the Philippines", Blue Snake Books : Berkeley.
Paman, J. (2009). Kombatan founder Ernesto A. Presas the man, the method. FMA Digest.
Paman, J., Paman, J., Ballantine, J., & Batangbakol, C. (2009). Great Grandmaster Ernesto A. Presas, Kombatan'', Filipino Martial Arts Digest. Nevada. (PDF)
Presas, E. (1985). "Arnis Presas Style and Balisong"
Presas, E., Avendanio, S., Torres, R. (1981). "The Art of Arnis: A modern presentation of an Ancient Martial Art"
Presas, E. (1996). "Filipino Modern Mano-Mano, Presas Style"
Presas, E. (1996). "Filipino Combative Police Techniques"
Presas, E. (1998). "Filipino Armas de Mano, Presas Style"
Presas, E. (1998). "Filipino Knife Fighting, Presas Style"
Presas, E. (2002). "Dumog, Presas Style"
Ziegler/Presas, E. (2005). "Kicking and Stretching for Children"

Presas, E. A., Philippine Combative Arts Series. (1995).
 Single Baton (Solo Baston)
 Double Baton (Doble Baston)
 Sword and Knife (Espada y daga)
 Force to Force (Doblete & Doblada)
 Staff (Bankaw)
 Police Techniques
 Umbrella (Sungkiti thrusts)
 Knife Fighting (Daga sa Daga)
 Hand-to-Hand Combat (Mano-mano)
 12 Baton Strikes Presas Style
 Small Rod (Dos Puntos & Dulo-dulo)

Presas, E. A., Kombatan Curriculum. (2007).
 Solo Baston System
 Double Baston System
 Mano-Mano System

External links
Kombatan - Northwest Chapter
Kombatan - Midwest Chapter
European Kombatan & Modern Mano Mano Associations
Kombatan - Danish Chapter
Kombatan - Austrian Chapter
East European Kombatan Community
Modern Arnis Kombatan - Italy
Modern Arnis Kombatan - Germany
Kombatan - Sweden
Kombatan - Colorado, USA
World Community Kombatan

Philippine martial arts
Arnis